Lambdina fiscellaria, the mournful thorn or hemlock looper, is a moth of the  family Geometridae. It is found in North America, from the Pacific to the Atlantic coast and from Canada south to Pennsylvania, Wisconsin and California.

The adult is grey to cream coloured with scalloped wing borders and resembles the oak besma. Darker line across forewings and hindwings, a second line across forewings. Area between lines may be shaded or unshaded. 

The wingspan is about 35 mm. The moth flies from August to early October depending on the location.

The larvae feed on hemlock, balsam fir, white spruce, oak and other hardwoods.

Subspecies
There are three recognized subspecies:
Lambdina fiscellaria fiscellaria – eastern hemlock looper
Lambdina fiscellaria lugubrosa – western hemlock looper
Lambdina fiscellaria somniaria – western oak looper or Garry oak looper

References

External links

Ourapterygini
Moths described in 1857